WinRumors was a website which was updated daily with news, rumors and reports about Microsoft and its products. The site was established in October 2010 by the site author, Tom Warren.

In 2011, WinRumors was nominated as "Best new blog of the year" by ComputerWeekly.

Jan 12, 2012 was the last post on WinRumors since his move to The Verge (website).

References

External links
Official Website

American technology news websites